Denton and Reddish is a constituency represented in the House of Commons of the UK Parliament since 2005 by Andrew Gwynne of the Labour Party.

Boundaries

The constituency presently consists of an electorate of about 65,500 in eastern Greater Manchester.  In historic terms, and in terms of distinct settlements, it covers the former townships of Audenshaw, Denton, Dukinfield, Haughton Green, Heaton Chapel, Heaton Norris and Reddish.

1983–1997: The Metropolitan Borough of Tameside wards of Audenshaw, Denton North East, Denton South, and Denton West, and the Metropolitan Borough of Stockport wards of Brinnington, Reddish North, and Reddish South.

1997–present: The Metropolitan Borough of Tameside wards of Audenshaw, Denton North East, Denton South, Denton West, and Dukinfield, and the Metropolitan Borough of Stockport wards of Reddish North and Reddish South.

History
Before the seat's creation in 1983 Reddish was part of the marginal Stockport North; the large Brinnington council estate (now in part bought under right to buy) was in the Labour safe seat of Stockport South; and Audenshaw and Denton formed the core of Manchester Gorton. Before it was added to this seat in 1997, Dukinfield was part of Stalybridge and Hyde.

Historically both Audenshaw and Denton West wards returned Conservative councillors, but this has not occurred since 1992 and 1987 respectively.

In the 2005 provisional recommendations of the Boundary Commission's Fifth Periodic Review, Reddish was to be repatriated with the Stockport constituency. Denton, Audenshaw and Dukinfield would have been joined with Droylsden East, Droylsden West and the St Peter's, Ashton-under-Lyne wards of Tameside to form a Denton constituency, wholly in Tameside. However, following a public inquiry into Greater Manchester's constituencies held in late 2005, changes to the original proposals for the county were made. It was recommended that the Denton and Reddish seat should remain unchanged, with slight readjustments to reflect the new ward boundaries introduced in 2004.  The new parliamentary boundaries in Greater Manchester took effect at the 2010 general election.

Members of Parliament

Elections

Elections in the 2010s

Elections in the 2000s

Elections in the 1990s

Elections in the 1980s

See also 
 List of parliamentary constituencies in Greater Manchester

Notes

References

Sources
Election results 1992–2005
Election results 1983–1992 

Parliamentary constituencies in Greater Manchester
Constituencies of the Parliament of the United Kingdom established in 1983
Politics of the Metropolitan Borough of Stockport
Politics of Tameside